The Women's 200 metres at the 2011 All-Africa Games took place on 14–15 September at the Estádio Nacional do Zimpeto.

The final held at 6:55 p.m. local time.

Medalists

Records
Prior to the competition, the records were as follows:

Schedule

Results

Heats
Qualification: First 3 in each heat (Q) and the next 3 fastest (q) advance to the semifinals.

Wind:Heat 1: -0.8 m/s, Heat 2: -0.8 m/s, Heat 3: -1.7 m/s, Heat 4: -2.7 m/s

Semifinals
Qualification: First 2 in each heat (Q) and the next 2 fastest (q) advance to the final.

Wind:Heat 1: +4.4 m/s, Heat 2: +2.8 m/s

Final
Wind: +1.9 m/s

References

External links
200 metres results at AfricaAthle.com

200 meters women
2011 in women's athletics